Charles Gustavus Whittaker (8 September 1819 – 15 November 1886) was an English first-class cricketer active 1839–48 who played for Kent. He was born and died in Barming, Kent. He played in 70 first-class matches as a right-handed batsman, scoring 844 runs with a highest score of 55; and as a right-arm roundarm fast bowler, taking 46 wickets with a best performance of six for (unknown).

References

1819 births
1886 deaths
English cricketers
Kent cricketers
Marylebone Cricket Club cricketers
Gentlemen cricketers
Non-international England cricketers
Gentlemen of Kent cricketers
Nicholas Felix's XI cricketers
Fast v Slow cricketers
People from Barming
Gentlemen of England cricketers